Urusi was a civitas and ancient episcopal see of the Roman province of Africa Proconsularis in present-day Tunisia.

The town flourished from 30BC until 640AD and has been tentatively identified with ruins at Henchir Soudga, in Siliana Governorate. The ruins lie just outside the Jebel Serj National Park.

Bishopric
The town was made famous by the courage of the martyr Mansuetus of Urusi, who was burned alive, according to Victor of Vita at the gate of Urusi. In 305, during the same persecution the basilicas of Lemsa, Zama and Furni, Tunisia had been burned.

The Diocese was re-created in name at least, in 1933 as a titular see and listed in the Annuario Pontificio.

Known bishops
Mansuetus, bishop of Urusi 
Quintianus of Urusi  fl.484
 William Thomas Porter, 1933–1950
Teófilo José Pereira de Andrade, 1951–1954
Peter Bernard Pereira 1955–1966 
Dante Frasnelli Tarter, 1967–1977
Celso José Pinto da Silva 1978–1981
José Carlos Castanho de Almeida 1982–1987
Luca Brandolini, 1987–1993
Jesús Esteban Catalá Ibáñez 1996–1999
josé María Libório Camino Saracho 1999–2002
Buenaventura Malayo Famadico 2002–2003
Julian Charles Porteous 2003–2013
Jose Elmer Imas Mangalinao 2016-2018
Aquilino Bocos Merino, C.M.F. 2018
VACANT

References

Cities in Tunisia
Catholic titular sees in Africa